The 1992–93 NBA season was the Warriors' 47th season in the National Basketball Association, and 30th in the San Francisco Bay Area. This season is most memorable when the Warriors drafted Latrell Sprewell from the University of Alabama with the 24th pick in the 1992 NBA draft. During the off-season, the team signed free agent Jeff Grayer. The Warriors were severely bitten by the injury bug all season losing their top players; Chris Mullin missed half the season with a torn ligament in his right thumb, only playing just 46 games, Tim Hardaway missed 16 games with a bruised right knee, Šarūnas Marčiulionis broke his right leg and dislocated his right ankle in a jogging accident before the season, returned to play 30 games, then sat out the rest of the year with Achilles tendonitis; and second-year star Billy Owens missed 45 games with a knee injury.

The Warriors struggled after an 18–14 start to the season, losing 15 of their next 17 games, including an 8-game losing streak between January and February, and held a 23–30 record at the All-Star break. After releasing oft-injured center Alton Lister to free agency in March, the team lost six of their final eight games of the season and finished sixth in the Pacific Division with a 34–48 record, failing to qualify for the playoffs.

Mullin led the team in scoring averaging 25.9 points per game, while Hardaway averaged 21.6 points, 10.6 assists and 1.8 steals per game, and was named to the All-NBA Third Team, and Sprewell averaged 15.4 points and 1.6 steals per game, and was named to the NBA All-Rookie Second Team. In addition, Owens provided the team with 16.5 points and 7.1 rebounds per game, while Marčiulionis contributed 17.4 points and 1.7 steals per game, second-year forward Chris Gatling averaged 9.3 points and 4.6 rebounds per game off the bench, and Tyrone Hill provided with 8.6 points and 10.2 rebounds per game. Mullin and Hardaway were both selected for the 1993 NBA All-Star Game, but Mullin did not participate due to injury. 

Following the season, Hill was traded to the Cleveland Cavaliers.

Offseason

Draft picks

Roster

Regular season

Season standings

z - clinched division title
y - clinched division title
x - clinched playoff spot

Record vs. opponents

Player statistics

Season

Awards and records
 Chris Mullin, NBA All-Star Game
 Tim Hardaway, NBA All-Star Game
 Tim Hardaway, All-NBA Third Team
 Latrell Sprewell, NBA All-Rookie Team Second Team

References

Golden State Warriors seasons
Golden State
Golden
Golden